The Silesian Eagle (German language: Schlesischer Adler) was a medal awarded to members of the German right-wing paramilitary group Freikorps Oberland for three or six months of service, as well as for fighting during the Silesian Uprisings during the Weimar Republic.

Instituted on the 19 of June 1919 by VI. Armee-Korps Generalleutnant Friedrich von Friedeburg, the award was given in two classes, 2nd class for three months of service and 1st class for 6 months of service. Following the Freikorps participation at the Battle of Annaberg, it was also awarded with oak leaves, swords, or both. This medal was one of the few Freikorps awards that were allowed to be worn on uniforms after the Wehrmacht banned unofficial medals in 1935. However, the swords and oak leaves were banned, but despite interdictions, many veterans continued wearing them in active military service in Nazi Germany.

References

Military awards and decorations of Germany
20th-century Freikorps
Weimar Republic